Wittman is an unincorporated community in Talbot County, Maryland, United States. Wittman is located at the intersection of Pot Pie Road, New Road, and Cummings Road south of Claiborne. Wittman has a post office, with the ZIP code 21676. The Flying Cloud was listed on the National Register of Historic Places in 1985.

References

Unincorporated communities in Talbot County, Maryland
Unincorporated communities in Maryland
Maryland populated places on the Chesapeake Bay